Yoto Vasilev Yotov (born May 22, 1969) is a Bulgarian–Croatian weightlifter. Yoto Yotov is one of the greatest Bulgarian weightlifters of all time. He is a two-time Olympic silver medalist, three-time world champion, six-time European champion, winner of the 1991 World Cup. Holds a total of 51 medals from the Olympic Games, World and European Championships in total, snatch and clean and jerk - 22 gold, 22 silver and 7 bronze. Because of his long career and many medals, he has been called the Professor. He was elected Athlete of the Year of Bulgaria for 1997. In 2020 he was awarded the highest state honors of Bulgaria in the field of sports - the Wreath of the winner.
He began training in 1984. He has competed for the clubs Minor Pernik, Levski and Dobrich. At the 1988 World and European Junior Championships in Athens became second. A year later in Fort Lauderdale, USA, he became the World Junior Champion. Following is a great career for men with three world titles, six European titles and two silver medals from the Olympics, as well as many other medals from major championships. At the end of his career, he competed for Croatia but did not win medals.

Yotov was competing as recently as October 2006. He represented Croatia in the Men's 85 kg class. He placed 17th with a snatch of 150 kg and jerk of 190 kg for a total of 340 kg.

Weightlifting achievements 
Silver medalist in Olympic Games (1992 and 1996);
Senior world champion (1991, 1993, 1997);
Silver medalist in Senior World Championships (1989, 1990, 1994, 1995);
Senior European champion (1990–1994, 1997);
Silver medalist in Senior European Championships (1989).

Notes 
Called "The Professor" because of his medals over a long timespan in a sport usually dominated by younger athletes.

External links 
Profile

1969 births
Living people
Bulgarian male weightlifters
Olympic weightlifters of Bulgaria
Weightlifters at the 1992 Summer Olympics
Weightlifters at the 1996 Summer Olympics
Olympic silver medalists for Bulgaria
Olympic medalists in weightlifting
Medalists at the 1996 Summer Olympics
Medalists at the 1992 Summer Olympics
European Weightlifting Championships medalists
World Weightlifting Championships medalists
20th-century Bulgarian people
21st-century Bulgarian people